Harrison County is a county located in the U.S. state of Mississippi. As of the 2020 census, the population was 208,621, making it the second-most populous county in Mississippi. Its county seats are Biloxi and Gulfport. The county is named after U.S. President William Henry Harrison.

Harrison County is part of the Gulfport-Biloxi metropolitan area.

The county was severely damaged from both Hurricane Camille on August 17, 1969, and Hurricane Katrina on August 29, 2005, causing catastrophic effects.

Geography
The Tchoutacabouffa River has its mouth at Biloxi Bay just north of the city of Biloxi. Gulfport, Mississippi, is the chief port in the state, with access to the Gulf of Mexico through a ship channel. This is the second-largest county in Mississippi by total area.

Wildlife
A single pond in the county contains the critically endangered dusky gopher frog.

Major highways

  Interstate 10
  Interstate 110
  U.S. Highway 49
  U.S. Highway 90
  Mississippi Highway 15
  Mississippi Highway 53
  Mississippi Highway 67
  Mississippi Highway 605
  Mississippi Highway 43

Adjacent counties and parishes
 Stone County (north)
 Jackson County (east)
 Hancock County (west)
 St. Bernard Parish, Louisiana (southwest)

National protected areas
 De Soto National Forest (part)
 Gulf Islands National Seashore (part)

Demographics

2020 census

As of the 2020 United States census,  208,621 people, 74,628 households, and 50,074 families were residing in the county.

2000 census
As of the census of 2000, 187,479 people, 71,538 households, and 48,574 families resided in the county. The population density was 326 people per square mile (126/km2). The 79,636 housing units had an average density of 137 per square mile (53/km2). The racial makeup of the county was 73.15% White, 21.09% African American, 0.45% Native American, 2.60% Asian,  0.99% from other races, and 1.72% from two or more races. About 2.59% of the population were Hispanic or Latinos of any race.

Of the 71,538 households, 33.5% had children under 18 living with them, 48.1% were married couples living together, 15.1% had a female householder with no husband present, and 32.1% were not families. About 25.8% of all households were made up of individuals, and 8.3% had someone living alone who was 65  or older. The average household size was 2.55, and the average family size was 3.07.

In the county, the age distribution was 26.0% under 18, 11.1% from 18 to 24, 30.5% from 25 to 44, 21.2% from 45 to 64, and 11.1% who were 65 or older. The median age was 34 years. For every 100 females, there were 99.10 males. For every 100 females 18 and over, there were 97.50 males.

The median income for a household in the county was $35,624, and for a family was $41,445. Males had a median income of $29,867 versus $22,030 for females. The per capita income for the county was $18,024. About 14.6% of the population and 11.6% of families were below the poverty line; 20.7% of those under 18 and 11.3% of those 65 and older were living below the poverty line.

Harrison County has the sixth-highest per capita income in Mississippi.

Corrections system
Harrison County has been studied by CNN and other media, which have reported on the beatings of inmates in the Harrison County Jail in Gulfport. Inmate Jessie Lee Williams Jr. died while in custody on February 4, 2006. In 2006 and 2007, six Harrison County Sheriff's Department deputies pleaded guilty to crimes related to the abuse of inmates at the jail. Sheriff Melvin Brisolara-R was elected in 2008, for Harrison County.

Communities

Cities
 Biloxi (county seat)
 D'Iberville
 Gulfport (county seat)
 Long Beach
 Pass Christian

Census-designated places
 DeLisle
 Henderson Point
 Lyman
 Saucier

Unincorporated communities
 Cuevas
 Howison
 Lizana
 Mississippi City
 Wool Market

Politics

Since 1964, Harrison County has voted overwhelmingly Republican. The last Democrat to receive over 40% of the vote was Jimmy Carter in 1976.

Education
School districts include:
 Biloxi Public School District
 Gulfport School District
 Harrison County School District
 Long Beach School District
 Pass Christian Public School District

See also

 Friendship Oak (Long Beach, Mississippi)
 Grass Lawn (Gulfport, Mississippi)
 Harrison Experimental Forest
 Historic Grand Hotels on the Mississippi Gulf Coast
 Land Trust for the Mississippi Coastal Plain
 Mississippi Aquarium
 National Register of Historic Places listings in Harrison County, Mississippi
 Old Brick House (Biloxi, Mississippi)
 Tivoli Hotel (Biloxi, Mississippi)
 Turkey Creek Community Historic District

References

Further reading
 Burt, D.E. and H.L. Welch. (2007). Quality of water in selected wells, Harrison County, Mississippi, 1997-2005 [U.S. Geological Survey Open-File Report 2007-1287]. Reston, VA: U.S. Department of the Interior, U.S. Geological Survey.

External links
 Official county site 
 Harrison County Sheriff
 Harrison County Courthouse Pictures

 
Mississippi counties
Gulfport–Biloxi metropolitan area
1841 establishments in Mississippi
Populated places established in 1841